F200, F 200, F.200 or F-200 may refer to :

 Drilling Rigs F200
 ESP F-200, an ESP Guitars model
 Farman F.200, a 1929 French civil utility aircraft 
 Mercedes-Benz F200, a 1996 concept car unveiled at the Paris Motor Show
 Goliath F200, a 1933 three-wheeler freight truck
 Daihatsu Hi-Line F200, a 1964 model of truck